This is an incomplete list of institutions of higher education in the state of Uttar Pradesh, India.

Universities
Uttar Pradesh has a total of 55 universities, the second-highest in all Indian states and territories.

Central
Uttar Pradesh has five Central Universities, the most for any Indian state along with Delhi:

State
There are 28 State universities in Uttar Pradesh:

Private
There are Sixteen Private Universities in Uttar Pradesh:

Deemed
The following ten institutions have been declared as Deemed Universities under section 3 of the UGC Act, 1956 by Ministry of Human Resource Development, Government of India:

Research institutions
Central Drug Research Institute, Lucknow
Central Institute of Medicinal and Aromatic Plants, Lucknow
Centre for Development of Advanced Computing, Noida
Govind Ballabh Pant Social Science Institute, Allahabad
Harish-Chandra Research Institute, Allahabad
Indian Institute of Pulses Research, Kanpur
Industrial Toxicology Research Centre, Lucknow
National Botanical Research Institute, Lucknow
National Bureau of Fish Genetic Resources, Lucknow
National Sugar Institute, Kanpur
Uttar Pradesh Textile Technology Institute, Kanpur

Autonomous institutes

There are six autonomous institutions of higher education in Uttar Pradesh:

 Indian Institute of Management, Lucknow: the fourth IIM to be established in India
 Indian Institute of Information Technology, Allahabad:  a premier institute in computer science and allied areas and a Deemed university
 Indian Institute of Information Technology, Lucknow:  one of Indian Institute of Information Technology which are funded by PPP, a Deemed university
 Indian Institute of Technology, Kanpur:  one of the sixteen Indian Institutes of Technology and Institutes of National Importance
 Indian Institute of Technology (Banaras Hindu University), Varanasi:  one of the sixteen Indian Institutes of Technology and Institute of National Importance
 Motilal Nehru National Institute of Technology, Allahabad:  one of the 20 National Institutes of Technology and Institute of National Importance
 National Institute of Fashion Technology, Raebareli
 Sanjay Gandhi Postgraduate Institute of Medical Sciences, Lucknow, a Institute under State Legislature Act 
 Rajiv Gandhi Institute of Petroleum Technology, Raebareli,and Institute of National Importance

Colleges

Engineering and management

 Institute of Engineering and Technology, Lucknow
 Bundelkhand Institute of Engineering and Technology, Jhansi
 Devprayag Institute of Technical Studies, Allahabad
 Institute of Management Technology, Ghaziabad
 Surya Group of Institutions, Lucknow
 University Institute of Engineering and Technology, Kanpur

Medicine
Baba Raghav Das Medical College, Gorakhpur
Ganesh Shankar Vidyarthi Memorial Medical College, Kanpur
Government Medical College, Azamgarh
Government Medical College,Faizabad
Government Medical College, Jalaun
Government Medical College, Kannauj
Institute of Medical Sciences, Banaras Hindu University
Jawaharlal Nehru Medical College, Aligarh
King George's Medical University, Lucknow
Lala Lajpat Rai Memorial Medical College, Meerut
Mahamaya Medical College, Akbarpur
Maharani Laxmi Bai Medical College, Jhansi
Maharshi Vashishtha Autonomous State Medical College, Basti
Motilal Nehru Medical College, Allahabad
Sanjay Gandhi Postgraduate Institute of Medical Sciences, Lucknow
Sarojini Naidu Medical College, Agra
Uttar Pradesh University of Medical Sciences, Saifai, Etawah

General

 Agra College, Agra
 Akbarpur Degree College Akbarpur, Kanpur Dehat
 Bareilly College, Bareilly
 Brahmanand College Kanpur
 Chaudhary Charan Singh Post Graduate College
 Christ Church College, Kanpur
 DAV College, Kanpur
 Dayanand Brajendra Swarup College 
 D.A.V. P.G. College, Lucknow
 Durgadutta Chunnilal Sagar Mal Post Graduate College, Mau
 Ewing Christian College
 Gandhi Faiz-E-Aam College, Shahjahanpur
 Halim Muslim PG College
 Hindu Degree College, Moradabad
 Institute of Social Sciences, Agra
 K.G.K. PG College
 Lucknow Christian College
 Meerut College
 National P. G. College, Lucknow
 Post Graduate College, Ghazipur
 Pandit Prithi Nath College Kanpur
 Ramabai Government Women Post Graduate College, Akbarpur, Ambedkar Nagar
 Shibli National College,Azamgarh
 SLJB PG College, Rajesultanpur
 SP Memorial Institute of Technology, Allahabad
 St. John's College, Agra
 VSSD College, Kanpur
 Wigan and Leigh College, India

Others
 Asian Academy of Film & Television, Noida
 Bhartendu Academy of Dramatic Arts
 Footwear Design and Development Institute
 Institute Of Dental Sciences Bareilly
 International Maritime Institute (IMI), Greater Noida
 Lloyd law college
 Lucknow College of Arts and Crafts
 Railway Protection Force Academy
 Veterinary College, Mathura

Madarsas
 Darul Uloom Deoband
 Darul-uloom Nadwatul Ulama, Lucknow
 Darul Uloom Waqf Deoband
 Mazahir Uloom Waqf Saharanpur
 Mazahirul Uloom Saharanpur

See also
 Education in India
 Education in Uttar Pradesh
 List of engineering colleges in Kanpur
 List of educational institutions in Lucknow
 List of educational institutions in Meerut

Notes

External links
 List of state government universities in Uttar Pradesh

References

Further reading
 
 

U